Renaissance Mons 44, or simply Mons, is a Belgian football club based in the Walloon city of Mons originally founded on 15 January 1945 as AS Quévy-le-Grand et Extensions. Nicknamed "the Dragons" as a reference to the legend of the Ducasse de Mons, the club plays in the 8,000-capacity Stade Charles Tondreau.

History
The first club created in Quévy-le-Grand was Cercle Sportif de Quévy-le-Grand in 1928, which played in blue and yellow but dissolved only a few years later in 1934. The actual official foundation of the club therefore is 15 January 1945, when AS Quévy-le-Grand et Extensions was created, joining the Belgian FA and starting to play in the Belgian Provincial Leagues, again in blue and yellow. 

In 1989, the club merged with the neighbouring FC Genly-Noirchain to form Union Sportive Genly-Quévy 89, changing its colours to orange and blue. The club obtained royal patronage upon its 50th year of existence in 1995, becoming RUS Genly-Quévy. Until that point, the club had played at the lowest levels of Belgian football, but from then on started moving up the ladder, especially in the early years of the 21st century. In 2007 the club promoted to the second provincial division, in 2009 to the first provincial division and in 2012 the club even reached the national level of Belgian football for the first time ever, moving into the Belgian Fourth Division. The club was able to maintain itself only for two seasons however, dropping back in 2014. 

In February 2015, the neighbouring team RAEC Mons went bankrupt and folded, with the remaining parts of the club merging with RUS Genly-Quévy 89 to form Royal Albert Quévy-Mons and relocating from Quévy to Mons. On 23 June 2020, the club was renamed to Renaissance Mons 44, following an initiative from RAEC Mons supporters. From the 2021–22 season on, the club hoped to reclaim the former matricule 44 of RAEC Mons and also reverted to the former name.

References

External links
 R.A.E.C. Mons at UEFA.COM
 R.A.E.C. Mons at EUFO.DE
 R.A.E.C. Mons at Worldfootball.net
 R.A.E.C. Mons at National Football Teams.com

 
Association football clubs established in 1928
1928 establishments in Belgium
R.A.E.C. Mons
Organisations based in Belgium with royal patronage